The  is a Japanese railway line connecting Kawanishi and Nishikichō stations, all within Iwakuni, Yamaguchi. As the name suggests, the line parallels the Nishiki River (Nishiki-gawa). This is the only railway line  operates. The third-sector company (in Japanese sense) took former West Japan Railway Company (JR West) line in 1987. The line was proposed to be extended to  Nichihara, on the Yamaguchi Line, but was not completed (see History section below). The company also operates bus lines and a travel agency.

Basic data
Distance: 
Gauge: 
Stations: 13
Track: single
Electric supply: not electrified
Railway signalling:
Kawanishi — Kita-Gōchi: Automatic
Kita-Gōchi — Nishikichō: Simplified automatic

Stations

History
The  opened to Kawayama on 1 November 1960, operated by Japanese National Railways (JNR), and was extended to Nishikichō in 1963. Construction of the proposed extension to Nichihara on the Yamaguchi Line commenced in 1967, and about 50% of the roadbed had been completed when construction was abandoned in 1980.

The Nishikigawa Railway was established on 1 April 1987, renaming and taking over operations of the line from 25 July of the same year.

See also
List of railway companies in Japan
List of railway lines in Japan

References
This article incorporates material from the corresponding article in the Japanese Wikipedia

External links 

  

Railway lines in Japan
Rail transport in Yamaguchi Prefecture
1067 mm gauge railways in Japan
Japanese third-sector railway lines